George T. Thomas was a Republican politician from Ohio in the United States. He was Speaker of the Ohio House of Representatives from 1904 to 1905.

Biography
George T. Thomas was born September 11, 1856 in Huron County, Ohio, and was brought up on a farm. He attended the local schools, Oberlin College, and Buchtel College, of Akron, Ohio. He taught at schools in Huron County, while living in Greenwich, where he was mayor in 1882.

In 1882, Thomas began study of law in the office of Skiles and Skiles of Shelby, Ohio, being admitted to the bar in 1886, and opening a law office in Norwalk, Ohio. He served two terms after being elected probate judge in 1890, returning to private practice in 1897.

In 1899, Thomas was elected to the Ohio House of Representatives as a Republican. He was elected to three two-year terms, and served as Speaker of the House during the last one, (1904–1905).

George T. Thomas was married to Emma J. Miller of Fairfield Township, Huron County, Ohio on April 10, 1880. They had a son, Alton O. Thomas, who also graduated from Buchtel College.

George T. Thomas was a representative in the Grand Lodge of Odd Fellows of Ohio. He died of sepsis in 1920.

References

Speakers of the Ohio House of Representatives
Republican Party members of the Ohio House of Representatives
People from Huron County, Ohio
1856 births
Ohio lawyers
Oberlin College alumni
University of Akron alumni
Mayors of places in Ohio
1920 deaths
19th-century American lawyers